Vade Mecum is an album by American jazz trumpeter Bill Dixon recorded in 1993 and released on the Italian Soul Note label.

Reception

In his review for AllMusic, Brian Olewnick states "The expansiveness and airiness of the sound here is one of this record's most striking qualities."

The authors of The Penguin Guide to Jazz Recordings called "Anamorphosis" "one of Dixon's most thoughtful conceptions," and commented: "Inside almost all of Dixon's small group recordings there is a dark pressure, like the imprint of a much larger composition that has been denied full expression. That is profoundly evident on Vade Mecum."

Track listing
All compositions by Bill Dixon
 "Moment" - 4:24  
 "Anamorphosis" - 12:29  
 "Viale Nino Bixio 20" - 9:17  
 "Pellucity"- 9:04  
 "Vade Mecum" - 15:52  
 "Twice Upon a Time" - 13:12  
 "Acanthus" - 13:25

Personnel
Bill Dixon - trumpet, flugelhorn
 Barry Guy, William Parker - bass
Tony Oxley - percussion

References 

1994 albums
Bill Dixon albums
Black Saint/Soul Note albums